Ilja Reijngoud (born 5 July 1972) is a Dutch jazz trombonist, composer, arranger and educator who has played with many renowned artists.
He won the Thelonious Monk Award in 2003.

Biography

Ilja Reijngoud was born in Leiden in the Netherlands in 1972. 
He studied at the Hilversum Conservatory, graduating cum laude in 1996, and continued to teach trombone at the conservatory after graduating.
In 1998 he founded the jazz trombone department at the Rotterdam Conservatory (Codarts) with his former teacher Bart van Lier. He conducts the Codarts Big Band, including an annual performance at the North Sea Jazz Festival with various international guests. He is also the main trombone teacher at the Utrechts Conservatorium and guest teacher at the Royal Conservatory of The Hague. 
He has taught clinics and workshops in Europe and the United States.

Discography
Recordings as a leader:

Recordings as a performer include:

As a writer or arranger:

References

External links

1972 births
Living people
Dutch jazz composers
Dutch jazz trombonists
People from Leiden
21st-century trombonists
Octurn members